Jennie June (pseudonyms Ralph Werther and Earl Lind, 1874 - ?) was an American writer from the Victorian and Edwardian era and activist known for advocating for the rights of people who did not conform to gender and sexual norms.

June was one of the earliest transgender individuals to publish an autobiography in the United States. He published his first autobiography, The Autobiography of an Androgyne, in 1918, and his second, The Female-Impersonators, in 1922. June also authored an unpublished third autobiography in 1921, which historians discovered in 2010. June's stated goal in writing these books was to help create what he would have wanted for himself: an accepting environment for young adults who do not conform to gender or sexual norms. He also wanted to prevent youth from committing suicide. June also created an organization for the rights of androgynes, together with others like himself.

Although June expressed a lifelong desire to be a woman, June consistently used he/him pronouns in reference to himself in his own writing. June wrote of feeling like a combination of male and female, and of his practice of alternating between these two gender expressions.

June wrote under the pseudonyms of Earl Lind and Ralph Werther, which are sometimes incorrectly mistaken for birth names. June's birth name and legal name have been considered lost to history and are not certain. Queer history researcher Channing Gerard Joseph claims that June was most likely the writer and journalist Mowry Saben (1870-1950), an early advocate for gender and sexual diversity.

Early life
Jennie June was born into a Puritan family in 1874 in Connecticut. He was assigned male at birth. At the time of his birth, his mother was 28 (born circa 1846), and his father 32 (born circa 1842). June was their fourth child out of eleven children. His family was white, middle-class, and wealthy.

Education 

June became very shy and introverted when his parents sent him off to a boys' school. The other students had been sent to boarding school because of being especially boisterous and needing strict discipline.

June graduated with honors from a university in uptown New York. That may have been Columbia University].

Then, June went on to graduate study, where his physician notified the university president that June was a sexual invert. As a result, June "was expelled from the university for being an androgyne," which caused him to suffer neurasthenia (depression), and he came close to suicide. Because of June's ordeal with being expelled for his difference, he wrote this plea in his third book, in capitals:

"I BEG ALL ADULTS, PARTICULARLY SCHOOL OFFICIALS, TO BE EXTRAORDINARILY CHARITABLE AND SYMPATHETIC WITH GIRL-BOYS AND OTHERS SEXUALLY ABNORMAL BY BIRTH WHO MAY SEEM TO HAVE LOST THEIR SENSES. GUARD AGAINST DOING ANYTHING THAT WOULD LEAD THE DISGRACED TO COMMIT SUICIDE, WHICH EVENT IS FAIRLY COMMON AMONG THESE 'STEPCHILDREN OF NATURE.'"

The suicide rate of lesbian, gay, bisexual, and transgender youth is still significantly higher than the general population today, due to discrimination.

Career 
In his professional life, June presented as a man. He had a reputation for being an innocent who was startled and uncomfortable when men around him made sexual talk. As a result, most people did not suspect another aspect to his life. He was known for being very studious and hard-working.

June was a law clerk for Clark Bell, who was the editor of the publishing company of The Medico-Legal Journal. This is the same company that published June's autobiographies. June likely used this personal contact with Bell in order to get the books into print.

Identity and transition 

During the Victorian and Edwardian eras, people did not yet use words like transgender, transsexual, gay, or non-binary gender. June described himself with all of these contemporary words for his gender and sexual variance: 
 androgyne, an ancient word meaning one who has a combination of masculine and feminine qualities.
 invert, a contemporary word from psychiatry and sexology for all kinds of people who we would now call lesbian, gay, bisexual, or transgender (LGBT).
 urning, a new contemporary word meaning someone assigned male at birth who is attracted to men. This word was created by urnings themselves who advocated for their rights. It was often Anglicized as "Uranian," but June used the original Germanic version "urning" for himself. Karl Heinrich Ulrichs (1825-1895) developed this theory in which men who are attracted to men and women who are attracted to women are thus because they are members of a third sex, a mixture of both male and female, and with the psyche or essence of the "opposite" sex, even though their bodies may not look like a mixture of male and female. The overall phenomenon he called Uranismus (in the original German, Urningtum), gay men were uranians (German urnings), lesbians were uraniads (German urningin, as -in is the feminine suffix), whereas heterosexuals were Dionings, so bisexual men were uranodionings, and so on, all of which were distinct from zwitter (intersex). Ulrichs based this naming system on Plato's Symposium, where two different kinds of love [...are] ruled by two different goddesses of love-- Aphrodite, daughter of Uranus, and Aphrodite, daughter of Zeus and Dione. The second Aphrodite rules those who love the opposite sex." Ulrichs argued that their condition was as natural and healthy as that of what we now call heterosexual people, and he started the movement fighting for their equal legal rights to express their love "between consenting adults, with the free consent of both parties," in his words from 1870, and that they should not be pathologized nor criminalized for doing so. Although Uranismus was generally addressed in terms of orientation, Ulrichs specifically described various categories of uranians in terms of their gender nonconformity and gender variance. For example, in regard to feminine gay men or queens (who he called Weiblings), Ulrichs wrote in 1879, "The Weibling is a total mixture of male and female, in which the female element is even predominant, a thoroughly hermaphroditically organized being. Despite his male sexual organs, he is more woman than man. He is a woman with male sexual organs. He is a neutral sex. He is a neuter. He is the hermaphrodite of the ancients." June compares himself to this ancient deity Hermaphroditus in his own self-portrait photography.
 bisexual, in the more old-fashioned sense of being somehow both male and female, since June said he was never attracted to women at all.
 "instinctive female impersonator," meaning that it was his nature to want to live as a woman.
 fairie [sic], a word widely used in the contemporary underworld for people who were assigned male at birth, and who had receptive sex with men
Many of these names reflect the contemporary way of thought, which made no distinction between gender identity and sexual orientation. There was a popular misconception during that era that if a man was attracted to men, then it must be because he was somehow partly a woman, in brain or even body. Some contemporaries recognized this was not true for everyone, arguing that men who liked men could be just as manly. However, for June, it was a suitable description of how he felt.

As young as the ages three to seven, June expected that he would only ever wear skirts after growing up, and asked playmates to call him Jennie. In that era, all very young children wore dresses. When older, boys would be "breeched," that is, switched to wearing masculine attire, with trousers. When June's parents breeched him at seven, he was so heartbroken that he wished he were dead. He occasionally borrowed a sister's clothing. He often prayed to be turned into a girl, and sometimes almost believed that his prayers were being answered. He began to have some breast growth in his middle teens, possibly gynecomastia, which is not rare in people who were assigned male at birth. He was disappointed that his genitals remained the same. At fourteen, he began to instead pray for one to two hours a day to no longer desire to be a girl, and to no longer desire males.

At eighteen, June became so depressed about being an invert that he sought medical help to make him feel like a "normal male." The two New York medical professors he went to first, venereologist Dr. Prince A. Morrow (1846 - 1913) and then alienist Dr. Robert S. Newton both saw inversion as a defect, and attempted for months to cure him of it by every known method. (Alienist was an early Victorian word for a psychiatrist.) June's treatments included drugs, hypnosis, aphrodisiacs in the hope of making June attracted to women, and electrical stimulation of the brain and spinal cord (electroconvulsive therapy). These treatments had no effect: June remained an invert, depressed, and also a nervous wreck from the drugs. Today conversion therapy is seen as ineffective and highly  abusive.

June's third doctor was an alienist who understood inversion better. (The transcription of the manuscript of The Riddle of the Underworld also calls him Dr. Robert S. Newton, giving this name to two different doctors, which is a transcription error.) The alienist taught June that being an androgyne was natural for him, and not a "depravity." This finally cured June's lifelong depression, because instead of trying to purge himself of his inversion out of the fear that it was a sin, he instead concluded that God had predestined him to be an invert.

At the age of 28, June fulfilled his lifelong desire to have an orchiectomy, removal of the testicles. June expected this would make him healthier and decrease his extreme and "disturbing" desires for sex, and eliminate some masculine features he disliked, such as facial hair. During that era, there was the incorrect but widespread medical belief that nocturnal emissions would damage a person's health and intelligence, and June was fearful of that possibility. Castration was one of the commonly recommended treatments thought to cure males of inversion.

Community and activism 

As a young adult, June found safe havens in places such as the gay bar Paresis Hall in New York City to express his feminine identity. Paresis Hall, or Columbia Hall, was one of many establishments considered the center of homosexual nightlife where male prostitutes would do as female prostitutes did, soliciting men under an effeminate persona. Places like Paresis Hall provided a place where people like June could gather and feel more free to express themselves and socialize with similar people in a time when cross dressing was socially unacceptable and illegal.

June was one of the members of the Cercle Hermaphroditos in 1895, led by pseudonymous Roland Reeves, along with other androgynes who frequented Paresis Hall. The purpose of the organization was "to unite for defense against the world's bitter persecution," and to show that being an invert was natural. The Cercle is noted by transgender historian Susan Stryker as "the first known informal organization in the United States to concern itself with what we might now call transgender social justice issues". Little evidence of the Cercle's existence is known to survive today, outside of June's autobiography. If it issued any pamphlets, none are yet known to historians. For this reason, some historians have raised questions about whether the Cercle existed at all.

Autobiography 
June published his first autobiography, The Autobiography of an Androgyne, in 1918, and his second, The Female-Impersonators, in 1922. Therefore June is one of the first transgender, or gender nonconforming, Americans to publicize their own story. In June's preface to the book, June explains that he has kept diaries of his life and that his autobiography has been taken from those.

June organized the book into episode-like sections, wherein he discusses incidents in his life as well as his opinions on certain social matters. June's stated goal in writing the book was to rally the support of Americans to create an accepting environment for young adults who do not adhere to gender and sexual norms, because that was what June would have wanted for himself, and he wanted to prevent them from committing suicide. June discusses his desires, which he struggled with because they were so different to what was considered normal.

The memoir describes in detail many personal narratives as well as June's sexual encounters and desires, including the story of his castration, but also contains pleas for understanding and acceptance of "fairies". The Autobiography of an Androgyne also describes how June felt that he lived a double life in the sense that he was an educated, middle-class white male scholar, but also had intense yearnings for performing sexual acts that distressed him.

The Riddle of the Underworld 
In 2010, Dr. Randall Sell, a professor at Drexel University, became intrigued by the first two volumes of the trilogy. After searching for around twenty years for the long-lost third volume, he finally discovered the partial manuscript in the archives of the National Library of Medicine.

Called The Riddle of the Underworld, written in 1921, this third volume was to focus on the communities of inverts all over the world. It includes an encounter in which June was beaten by men whom he had tried to pick up. June once again defends gender and sexual nonconformists, insisting that they were simply born of a different nature, but natural nonetheless.

Death

Currently, historians do not certainly know the date or circumstances of June's death. It however is known that Mowry Saben, proposed by C.G. Joseph to be June, died in San Francisco in 1950. June left instructions for the creation of a memorial plaque. June wanted the plaque to be placed on the Grand Street facade of a new police building, near the site of his debut, where he had first taken the name Jennie June. A police building could be considered an intriguing choice, because police harassed and terrorized June and his friends, giving him frequent nightmares.

Bibliography
Autobiography of an Androgyne, published 1918
The Female-impersonators, published 1922
The Riddle of the Underworld, written in 1921, unpublished. Only three chapters of the manuscript are known to survive

Photos

Jennie June published these photographs of himself in his books. Along with June's use of pseudonyms, these photos mostly obscure June's face, as a further protection of anonymity, even while exposing June's body, because there were laws in New York against cross-dressing. Some of these photographs treat their subjects as medical specimens, because a popular Victorian pseudoscience called physiognomy believed that the personality could be seen in the shape of the body, supporting June's argument that it is in his nature to be an invert. The statue that June imitates in one of these photos is the Sleeping Hermaphroditus, a lost bronze original by the ancient Greek Polycles (working ca 155 BC). The Borghese Hermaphroditus is usually considered the main ancient Roman copy of that lost original, and has been in the Louvre since before 1863. The one in Uffizi that June mentions is another ancient Roman copy.

See also
 The Public Universal Friend, an 18th century genderless preacher from a religious family in New England
 History of transgender people in the United States

Notes

References

Bibliography

External links 

Out History's Information and Transcription of The Riddle of the Underworld 

1874 births
19th century in LGBT history
19th-century American LGBT people
20th-century pseudonymous writers
American autobiographers
Transgender memoirists
LGBT people from Connecticut
American LGBT rights activists
Transgender non-binary people
Writers from Connecticut
Year of death missing
American transgender writers
American non-binary writers